Neryungri (Nerunŋa; , Nüörüŋgürü) is the second largest town in the Sakha Republic, Russia and the administrative center of Neryungrinsky District. As of the 2010 Census, its population was 61,747.

Etymology
The name of the town comes is believed to come from Evenki Ньируунгра nyuruungra, meaning "river of graylings".

History
It was founded due to the development of the nearby coal basin and was granted town status in 1975.

Administrative and municipal status
Within the framework of administrative divisions, Neryungri serves as the administrative center of Neryungrinsky District. As an inhabited locality, Neryungri is classified as a town under republic jurisdiction. As an administrative division, it is incorporated within Neryungrinsky District as the Town of Neryungri. As a municipal division, the Town of Neryungri is incorporated within Neryungrinsky Municipal District as Neryungri Urban Settlement.

Economy
The town is the center of a large coal field discovered about 1970. It is located on the Amur–Yakutsk Mainline and the Lena Highway,  by rail north of Tynda.

Climate
Neryungri has a subarctic climate (Köppen climate classification Dfc) with mild summers and severe winters. Precipitation is moderate, but is significantly higher in the summer than at other times of the year. The climate is extremely cold for the latitude in part due to the Siberian High bringing extremely cold polar air to the city in winters, whereas the relatively high elevation and proximity to the cold Sea of Okhotsk usually prevents the heat waves seen in lower areas of Sakha.

References

Notes

Sources
Official website of the Sakha Republic. Registry of the Administrative-Territorial Divisions of the Sakha Republic. Neryungrinsky District.

External links
 Unofficial website of Neryungri

Cities and towns in the Sakha Republic
Cities and towns built in the Soviet Union
Socialist planned cities